Fair Wind, "Blue Bird"! is a 1967 Soviet-Yugoslav children's adventure film directed by Mikhail Ershov, based on the eponymous story by Boris Kosier.

Plot
Aboard the schooner "Blue Bird" traveling on the Adriatic are schoolchildren, winners of the questionnaire "For Peace and Mutual Understanding". Taking advantage of the fact that the ship, when entering the ports, is released from customs inspection, an international gang organizes the delivery of a consignment of drugs. Mrs. Rips, an observer from the Society for the Patronage of Animals and her companion, the circus Lorimur act as couriers.

A radio amateur from the US, schoolboy Ralph and his Yugoslav friend, Milan, consider the behavior of Monsieur Vilar, the pediatrician attached to the expedition, as very strange. The guys arrange for him to be followed until it turns out that the doctor is an agent of Interpol, and the real offender is Lorimur. After the refusal of Mrs. Rips to dine at the same table with a boy from Senegal, by decision of the general meeting, she is dropped off at the nearest port. The remaining companion is forced to request help from gangsters on the radio.

During the performance at an improvised concert, the guys search the artist's cabin and find the drugs hidden in paint tubes. Lorimur reaches the island on a lifeboat, but is captured by Ralph and Milan, who pursued him. The captain with the sailors and Monsieur Vilar arrives in time to arrest the fugitive, and later the gangster who appears behind the cargo.

Cast
Blazhenka Catalinić as Mrs. Rips
Radmila Karaklajić as Gina Savić
Vitaly Doronin as captain of the schooner "Blue Bird"
Boris Amarantov as Lorimur (voiced by Alexander Demyanenko)
Alexander Yesic as Monsieur Vilar
Milan Puzic as lieutenant
Demetr Bitents as correspondent (voiced by Oleg Basilashvili)
Milenko Jovanović as Milan Petrović from Yugoslavia
Evgenia Vetlov as Tanya Ivleva from the USSR
Alexander Gavrilov as Ralph Barney from the United States
Valery Komlev as Alec from Great Britain
Vladimir Pak as Kyoto from Japan
Larissa Taranenko as Ulla Nilsson from Sweden
Azer Kurbanov as Pablo Gonzales from Brazil
Robert Zotov as Thomas from Senegal
Svetlana Vishnyakova as Tampiko from Japan
Irina Shirokova as Mahraba from India

References

External links

Russian children's adventure films
Soviet adventure films
Lenfilm films
Soviet multilingual films
Serbo-Croatian-language films
1960s Russian-language films
Yugoslav multilingual films
1960s multilingual films
Yugoslav adventure films
1967 adventure films
1960s children's adventure films
Films set in the Mediterranean Sea
Films about racism
Films about Interpol
Films scored by Andrey Petrov
Soviet children's films